Armenak Alachachian (alternate spellings: Armenak Alajajian or Alatchatchan) (December 25, 1930 – December 4, 2017) was an Armenian-Soviet basketball player and coach. A point guard, he reached European stardom with CSKA Moscow and the senior men's Soviet Union national team. He was born in Alexandria, Egypt.

Club career
Alachachian helped CSKA lift its first EuroLeague title in 1961. He added a second title in 1963, and reached another final in 1965, before retiring.

Soviet National Team 
As a player of the senior men's Soviet national team, Alachachian won four gold medals at the 1953, 1961, 1963, and 1965 EuroBasket, as well as a silver medal at the 1964 Summer Olympic Games.

Coaching career
Aleksandar Gomelsky, at the time CSKA's sports director, assigned him at the coach position in the late 1960s, and Alachachian led the Reds to the 1969 Euroleague title, thus becoming the first man to lift the trophy, as both a player and a coach.

See also 
 List of EuroLeague-winning head coaches

References
FIBA Profile "Armenak Alachachian"
FIBA Profile "Armenak Alatchatchan"
Fibaeurope.com Profile

Euroleague.net - Player nominees for Euroleague's 50 Greatest Contributors
Armenak Alachachian's obituary

1930 births
2017 deaths
Armenian men's basketball players
Basketball players at the 1964 Summer Olympics
Egyptian people of Armenian descent
Egyptian emigrants to the Soviet Union
EuroLeague-winning coaches
FIBA EuroBasket-winning players
Medalists at the 1964 Summer Olympics
Olympic basketball players of the Soviet Union
Olympic medalists in basketball
Olympic silver medalists for the Soviet Union
PBC CSKA Moscow coaches
Point guards
Soviet Armenians
Soviet men's basketball players
Sportspeople from Alexandria
Honoured Masters of Sport of the USSR